A phosphorane (IUPAC name: λ5-phosphane) is a functional group in organophosphorus chemistry with pentavalent phosphorus. It has the general formula PR5. The parent hydride compound is the hypothetical molecule PH5. The derivative pentaphenylphosphorane (Ph5P) is stable.

Phosphoranes adopt a trigonal bipyramidal molecular geometry with the two apical bonds longer than the three equatorial bonds. Hypervalent bonding is described by inclusion of non-bonding MOs, as also invoked for the closely related molecule phosphorus pentafluoride.

Phosphoranes of the type R3P=CR2 are more common and more important. Phosphoranes are also considered to be one of the resonance structures of ylides, these compounds feature a tetrahedral phosphorus center including a phosphorus–carbon double bond. These compounds are used as reagents in the Wittig reaction, for instance methylenetriphenylphosphorane or Ph3P=CH2.

See also 
 Organophosphorus chemistry
 Phosphane

References 

Organophosphanes
Functional groups